Sedan is an unincorporated community in Nuckolls County, Nebraska, United States.

History
A post office was established at Sedan in 1906, and remained in operation until it was discontinued in 1951. It was named after Sedan, in France.

References

Unincorporated communities in Nuckolls County, Nebraska
Unincorporated communities in Nebraska
Populated places established in 1906
1906 establishments in Nebraska